Michel Leclerc (born 24 April 1965) is a French director and screenwriter.

Career
During the 1990s, Leclerc worked as a TV editor and cameraman. He also wrote and directed a number of shorts. For years, he was a columnist on television shows such as C'est ouvert le samedi and Nulle part ailleurs on Canal+, and Mon Kanar on France 3. He is also the singer and songwriter of the group Minaro. In 2011, he won the César Award for Best Original Screenplay for the film The Names of Love.

Filmography

References

External links

 

1965 births
Living people
French screenwriters
French television directors
Film directors from Paris